Sharlene Santos San Pedro (born April 5, 1999) is a Filipino actress, singer, vlogger, streamer, VJ, and TV host.

She made her first television appearance at the age of four when she joined ABS-CBN's talent search Star Circle Quest: Kids Edition in 2004, and came in at second place. She is known for portraying the roles of Gigi, Calla & Lily, and Shirley in the series Mga Anghel na Walang Langit, Calla Lily, and Luv U respectively. She also played the title role in Princess Sarah in 2007.

San Pedro received her first acting award as the "Most Popular Child Actress" by the Guillermo Mendoza Memorial Scholarship Foundation in 2009. In 2012, San Pedro was nominated in the 17th Asian Television Awards as Best Actress in a Lead-Drama Role for her portrayal as a teenage mother in the Maalaala Mo Kaya episode, "T-Shirt".

Early life
Sharlene Santos San Pedro was born on April 5, 1999, in Pulilan, Bulacan to parents Hector, a business man, and Myleen. She has two brothers named Jeremy and Clark: the former being the oldest of the three, while the latter is the youngest. She attended Sto. Cristo Elementary School during kindergarten.

Career

2004–2006: Star Circle Quest and Goin' Bulilit
In 2004, San Pedro joined the reality-based talent competition Star Circle Quest on ABS-CBN. Together with the other contestants, San Pedro had undergone talent training, physical enhancement and different challenges to test their talent skills.

She managed to be in the "Magic Circle of 5" with fellow competitors Nash Aguas, Aaron Junatas, Mikylla Ramirez, and CJ Navato. During the 'Grand Questors Night' held on June 5, 2004, in Araneta Coliseum, she won first runner-up. Soon after, she became a part of Star Magic with an exclusive contract with ABS-CBN. Her acting career began in the same year, portraying the young Faith/Tala in Krystala.

In February 2005, San Pedro was cast in the then newly launched sketch comedy gag show, Goin Bulilit, featuring children in various comedic situations. She was in the main cast until 2011 when she graduated. The 'Seventh Batch Graduates', including San Pedro, left due to the fact that the show is for kids, while they were already growing older.

Aside from being one of the original mainstays in Goin Bulilit, San Pedro also starred in OK Fine Whatever sitcom, again, with Aguas. In addition, she was one of the main cast in Mga Anghel na Walang Langit, portraying as Gigi. Her performance involved heavy drama acting since the series depicts the lives of exploited and unfortunate children. She was next cast to play two different characters on ABS-CBN's television series Calla Lily. The story was about Calla and Lily (both played by San Pedro) who have different personalities: one is outspoken while the other is shy.

2007–2011: Film projects and recognition

In 2007, San Pedro became the main lead once again in ABS-CBN's Princess Sarah after Calla Lily. The next year, Sharlene was chosen to portray the role of Young Selene in Rounin, a fantasy and martial arts series shot using high-definition video technology, a first in the Philippine series. The series marked San Pedro and Jairus Aquino's first team-up; they were once again paired up later on as on-screen teenage sweethearts in Luv U in 2013.

In October 2008, she was cast on her first film, Mag-ingat Ka Sa... Kulam, with Judy Ann Santos. Her performance earned her a nomination for the Movie Child Performer of the Year at the 25th PMPC Star Awards for Movies. She also appeared as a guest star in the series Kung Fu Kids, playing the role of Reyna Ungga-Ungga, the person who eventually helped the seven Kung Fu kids in their battles. The next year, San Pedro joined the cast of Kamoteng Kahoy, an indie film by Maryo J. de los Reyes. She was also cast with Jairus Aquino in ABS-CBN's Pieta as Kakai Angeles.

San Pedro received her first acting award as the Most Popular Child Actress by the Guillermo Mendoza Memorial Scholarship Foundation. In addition, she was nominated the Best Comedy Actress by the PMPC Star Awards for TV for two consecutive years since 2008 for her character roles in Goin Bulilit. Her portrayal of young Mabel in the horror suspense film Segunda Mano marked her fourth film and her first official entry to the 2011 Metro Manila Film Festival. The following year, she played Nene in Corazon: Ang Unang Aswang.

Following the start of her teenage years came the end of her spot in Goin Bulilit. After six years, she left the show in 2011.

2012–2017: Teenage years, international recognition and Luv U

During her career gap, she frequently stars in Maalaala Mo Kaya series, which features weekly real-life stories or anecdotes of common people or even famous celebrities and personalities through letter-sending.

In 2012, she starred in Larong Bata, a film promoted and supported by the Department on Education for it showed the effects of bullying among kids. The film received positive reviews and was frequently shown in the different schools in the Philippines. In the same year, she was nominated in the 17th Asian Television Awards as Best Actress in a Lead-Drama Role for her portrayal as a teenage mother in the Maalaala Mo Kaya episode, "T-Shirt". The next year, she starred as Lavinia in Star Cinema's Must Be Love released on March 13. She later joined the second-season cast of Luv U.

In 2014, she starred in Wansapanatym'''s month-long special "Si Lulu at Si Liit" with Jairus Aquino and Francis Magundayao. The story and their team-up received favorable reviews and consecutive high ratings. She started appearing in the Primetime series again soon after, now as a teenager. She received guest roles in FlordeLiza and FPJ's Ang Probinsyano, wherein she was reunited with Nash Aguas in the latter. She also starred as one of the supporting cast in Nathaniel in 2015. By the end of the year, she was cast in the 2015 Metro Manila Film Festival film entry Haunted Mansion as Faye. Her acting was praised as she "...displays acting chops honed from years in the business. She does not resort to hysterics, but doles out an even and even mature performance as Ella's best friend.

Together with Jairus Aquino, San Pedro was announced to be one of the new video jockeys in the music channel myx in the beginning of the year 2016. According to the announcement, ever since "[t]hey... won as the MYX Celebrity VJ Duo in the show's weekly online poll [in February 2015], their followers have shown interest in seeing them again on the music channel". Both were also cast in Wansapanatym's "Susi Ni Sisay" by Wenn V. Deramas. This was Deramas' last TV project before he died. Still paired with Aquino, San Pedro was supposed to appear in Written in Our Stars as a supporting cast but the show was postponed due to lead star Toni Gonzaga's pregnancy announcement. During this time, they were cast in the noon-time drama series Langit Lupa.

Also in 2016, San Pedro pursued her singing career when she launched her first single "Paraan". The song is a cover of Filipino band Mayonnaise's track from their album Tayo na Lang Dalawa released in 2014. The band members, significantly its singer, Monty Macalino, worked closely with her and supported her to pursue her singing career. An accompanying music video was also released under Yellow Room and directed by Chuck Ronquillo. Her cover single received the Favorite Remake award at the 12th Myx Music Awards held the next year. In 2017, she released another cover single "Stars & Caramel Bars", originally performed by Filipino indie band Sourberry. The music video accompaniment features Arturo Daza, her co-VJ in MYX.

2018–present: Singing career and Class of 2018

After releasing two cover singles in 2016 and 2017, respectively, San Pedro continued to pursue her music career. In June 2018, she signed a contract with Ivory Music and Video. She then released two original singles entitled "Pa'no Ang Lahat" and "Everything Will Be Alright" accompanied by music videos. In June 2019, she performed as a special guest during Mayonnaise's first major concert Akalain Mo 'Yun at the Music Museum. In September, she was once again invited to perform on the band's sophomore concert, Akalain Mo 'Yun Part 2, three months after the success of the first one.

In May 2018, San Pedro was cast in TRex Entertainment's teen suspense–thriller film Class of 2018 alongside Nash Aguas, Kristel Fulgar, and CJ Navato. The four of them were former part of Goin' Bulilit cast. This marks as her first lead role in a film and her first time in years to act again. Her drama episode in Maalaala Mo Kaya (for which she received the "Best Single Performance by an Actress" nomination at the 32nd PMPC Star Awards for Television) was her most recent work. Her performance as Ada in the film received satisfactory reviews: the critics agreed that she has a screen presence especially since she achieved in performing her role, whether during fight-scenes, heart-fluttering scenes or drama scenes.

In May 2019, San Pedro and Aguas have partnered once again in iWant's digital film The Gift directed by Onat Diaz. It was filmed way back in 2016. San Pedro plays the role of Tina, a sheltered woman who has a congenital heart problem. Due to its digital platform release, "the film received positive feedback online for its lead stars' performances and relatable story, and for promoting awareness on the developmental disorder".

After leaving MYX as a VJ, San Pedro started hosting television and online shows in 2019.

Personal life and education
Outside of acting, she also sings, plays the guitar, and collects watches.

She finished high school at the Sanctuary Christian School in 2015. In 2022 she graduated from AMA University with a degree in AB Psychology 

Public image
Star Cinema recognized San Pedro as the most promising female star in 2014 after she won the votes from the fans. The production company lists that she is a "versatile teen actress", "hard worker", "talented", "the next big thing", and "being an inspiration to people".

Hosting

San Pedro made her hosting debut with the music channel MYX in 2016, although she first started as a guest video jockey in February 2015. Her guest appearance allowed her to receive the "Favorite MYX Celebrity VJ" nomination at the 11th MYX Music Awards. After her successful stint as a MYX Celebrity VJ, she was given a regular spot in the music channel in the beginning of the year 2016. Her role as a MYX VJ included introducing music videos, hosting segments, and interviewing singers. She was a MYX VJ for three years.

In 2019, she started to appear on the online counterpart of the variety show ASAP, known as iWant ASAP, both as a guest and a guest/co-host. According to iWant ASAP, she was the Most Requested Artist in the show. She also joined the other hosts in the award-winning variety show S.M.A.C. Pinoy Ito Season 3 and the new online show Your Moment Apartment (the online counterpart of the reality talent competition show Your Moment) in IBC 13 and ABS-CBN, respectively.

She was also invited to host events, regional shows, and others.

Filmography
Film

Television

Digital shorts
 2017: MYX Halloween Special: "Kwintas"
 2018: Coffee Break'' – "Decaf"
 2018: "Gusto Ko Lang Kasama Ka Palagi" by Mayonnaise

Reality/Variety shows

Discography

Singles

Videography

Video albums

Other releases

Music videos

Awards and nominations

References

External links

 
 
 

1999 births
Living people
Star Circle Quest participants
Star Magic
Actresses from Bulacan
Filipino television actresses
Filipino child actresses
VJs (media personalities)
People's Television Network